Wimmerella is a genus of flowering plants belonging to the family Campanulaceae. It is also in the Lobelioideae subfamily.

It is native to the Cape Provinces and KwaZulu-Natal within South Africa.

Known species
There are 10 accepted species;

The genus name of Wimmerella is in honour of Franz Elfried Wimmer (1881–1961), an Austrian clergyman and botanist, also professor of natural history in Istanbul, Turkey and specialist in Lobeliaceae. 
It was first described and published in Novon Vol.9 on page 415 in 1999.

References

Lobelioideae
Campanulaceae genera
Plants described in 1999
Flora of the Cape Provinces
Flora of KwaZulu-Natal